Hunter Renfro may refer to:

Hunter Renfroe (born 1992), American baseball player
Hunter Renfrow (born 1995), American football player